Barbara Rush (born January 4, 1927) is an American actress. In 1954, Rush won the Golden Globe Award as most promising female newcomer for her role in the 1953 American science-fiction film It Came from Outer Space. Later in her career, Rush became a regular performer in the television series Peyton Place, and appeared in TV movies, miniseries, and a variety of other programs, including the soap opera All My Children and family drama 7th Heaven, as well as starring in films, including The Young Philadelphians, The Young Lions, Robin and the 7 Hoods, and Hombre.

Early life and education
Rush was born in Denver. Her father, Roy, was a lawyer for a Midwest mining company. She grew up in Santa Barbara, California. She attended the University of California, Santa Barbara and graduated in 1948. She started her career in the university's theatre program.

Career
Rush performed on stage at the Pasadena Playhouse before signing with Paramount Pictures. She made her screen debut in 1950's The Goldbergs. In 1951, she co-starred in the classic George Pal sci-fi film When Worlds Collide. In 1952, she starred in Flaming Feather with Sterling Hayden and Victor Jory. In 1954, she won the Golden Globe Award for "Most Promising Newcomer – Female" for her performance in It Came from Outer Space.

Rush starred as the wife of James Mason in the acclaimed 1956 drama Bigger Than Life, in which a school teacher's use of an experimental drug results in his threatening harm to his family. She was the love interest of reluctant soldier Dean Martin in the war story The Young Lions and of ambitious lawyer Paul Newman in The Young Philadelphians.

Rush began her career on stage, and it has always been a part of her professional life. In 1970, she earned the Sarah Siddons Award for dramatic achievement in Chicago theatre for her leading role in Forty Carats and brought her one-woman play A Woman of Independent Means to Broadway in 1984. She began working on television in the 1950s. She later became a regular performer in TV movies, miniseries, and a variety of other shows including Peyton Place and the soap opera All My Children.

In 1962, she guest-starred as Linda Kinkcaid in the episode "Make Me a Place" on The Eleventh Hour starring Wendell Corey and Jack Ging. In 1962–1963, she appeared three times as Lizzie Hogan on Saints and Sinners. In 1965, she appeared in a two-part episode of The Fugitive titled "Landscape with Running Figures" as Marie Gerard, wife of police detective Lt. Philip Gerard. In 1967 she guest-starred on the series Custer.

She often played a willful woman of means or a polished, high-society doyenne. Rush also was cast in an occasional villainess role, as in the Rat Pack's gangster musical Robin and the 7 Hoods (1964). In the 1967 Western drama Hombre, she played a rich, younger, condescending wife of a thief - and ends up taken hostage and tied to a stake. She portrayed the devious Nora Clavicle in the TV series Batman. In 1976, Rush played the role of Ann Sommers/Chris Stewart, the mother of female sci-fi action character Jaime Sommers in The Bionic Woman.

After appearing in the 1980 disco-themed Can't Stop the Music, Rush returned to television work. She was a cast member on the early 1980s soap opera Flamingo Road as Eudora Weldon. In 1998, she was featured in an episode titled "Balance of Nature" on the television series The Outer Limits. In 1989, Rush toured on stage in the national company of Steel Magnolias as the character M'Lynn. She has continued to make guest appearances on television. In 2007, she played the recurring role of Grandma Ruth Camden on the series 7th Heaven.
Since then, she has made occasional appearances for the Theatre Guild in an Orange County, CA.

Personal life
Rush married actor Jeffrey Hunter in 1950; they divorced in 1955. She married publicist Warren Cowan in 1959, but they divorced in 1969. Rush married sculptor Jim Gruzalski in 1970 after they met at an Engelbert Humperdinck concert. They divorced in 1973.

Rush has two children, Christopher Hunter (with Hunter) and Claudia Cowan (with Cowan). The latter is a journalist with Fox News. She is the aunt of actress Carolyn Hennesy.

As of May 1997, Rush lives in the Harold Lloyd Estate in Beverly Hills, California.

In popular culture

In the 1975 film Shampoo, the hairdresser to the stars, with a reputation of sleeping with his clients George Roundy is portrayed by Warren Beatty. When seeking a bank loan, he is asked if he has any references, to which he replies "I do Barbara Rush."

Filmography

The Goldbergs (1950) as Debby Sherman
Quebec (1951) as Madelon
The First Legion (1951) as Terry Gilmartin
When Worlds Collide (1951) as Joyce Hendron
Flaming Feather (1952) as Nora Logan
Prince of Pirates (1953) as Countess Nita Orde
It Came from Outer Space (1953) as Ellen Fields
Taza, Son of Cochise (1954) as Oona
Magnificent Obsession (1954) as Joyce Phillips
The Black Shield of Falworth (1954) as Meg
Captain Lightfoot (1955) as Aga Doherty
Kiss of Fire (1955) as Princess Lucia
World in My Corner (1956) as Dorothy Mallinson
Bigger Than Life (1956) as Lou Avery
Flight to Hong Kong (1956) as Pamela Vincent
Oh Men! Oh Women! (1957) as Myra Hagerman
No Down Payment (1957) as Betty Kreitzer
The Young Lions (1958) as Margaret Freemantle
Harry Black and the Tiger (1958) as Christian Tanner
The Young Philadelphians (1959) as Joan Dickinson
The Bramble Bush (1960) as Margaret 'Mar' McFie
Strangers When We Meet (1960) as Eve Coe
Deadline: San Francisco (1962 TV movie)
Come Blow Your Horn (1963) as Connie
The Unknown (1964 TV movie) as Leonora Edmond
Robin and the 7 Hoods (1964) as Marian
The Jet Set (1966 TV movie)
Hombre (1967) as Audra Favor
Strategy of Terror (1969) as Karen Lownes
Suddenly Single (1971 TV movie) as Evelyn Baxter
Cutter (1972 TV movie) as Linda
The Eyes of Charles Sand (1972 TV movie) as Katharine Winslow
The Man (1972) as Kay Eaton
Moon of the Wolf (1972 TV movie) as Louise Rodanthe
Crime Club (1973 TV movie) as Denise London
Peege (1973 short) as Mom
Superdad (1973) as Sue McCready
Fools, Females and Fun (1974 TV movie) as Karen Markham
The Last Day (1975 TV movie) as Betty Spence
Death Car on the Freeway (1979 TV movie) as Rosemary
Can't Stop the Music (1980) as Norma White
Summer Lovers (1982) as Jean Featherstone
The Night the Bridge Fell Down (1983 TV movie) as Elaine Howard
At Your Service (1984 TV movie) as Barbara Stonehill
Web of Deceit (1990 TV movie) as Judith
Widow's Kiss (1996 TV movie) as Edith Fitzpatrick
My Mother's Hairdo (2006 short) as Fate
Bleeding Hearts (2017 short) as Barbara Irons

Theatre credits

The Golden Ball (1937) stage debut
The Little Foxes USC Santa Barbara, 1948 and 1975 
Antony and Cleopatra (1950) Pasadena Playhouse
Summer Stock (1951) with Anthony Perkins
The Madwoman of Chaillot (1951) with Jeffrey Hunter
The Voice of the Turtle (1953), with Jeffrey Hunter
Always April (1969)
40 Carats (1969-1971,1972) national tour
The Four Poster (1971)
Unsinkable Molly Brown (1972)
Butterflies Are Free (1972, 1981)
Private Lives (1973) national tour with Louis Jourdan
Father's Day (1974) national tour with Carole Cook
Finishing Touches (1974, 1978)
Hay Fever (1975, 1980)
Kennedy's Children (1975, 1976)
Endangered Species (1976)
Same Time, Next Year (1976-1978) national tour
Night of the Iguana (1978)
Twigs (1980)
The Supporting Cast (1982) national tour with Carole Cook and Sandy Dennis 
Blithe Spirit (1982-1983)
Disabled Genius (1983)
Woman of Independent Means (1983-1988) Broadway and national tour
Steel Magnolias (1988-1989) national tour with Carole Cook, June Lockhart and Marion Ross
Love Letters (1990-1993)
Vagina Monologues (1995-1997)
A Delicate Balance (1993)
The Golden Age (1997)
Make Me A Place at Forest Lawn (2002-2007)

Television

Lux Video Theatre (1954-1956, 4 episodes) as Cathy / Ruth / Charlotte / Joyce Gavin
Playhouse 90 (1957-1960, 2 episodes) as Liz / Clara
The Eleventh Hour (1962, 1 episode) as Linda Kincaid
Saints and Sinners (1962-1963, 4 episodes) as Lizzie Hogan
The Outer Limits (1964, 1 episode: "The Forms of Things Unknown") as Leonora Edmond
Dr. Kildare (1965, 2 episodes) as Madge Bannion
The Fugitive (1965, 2 episodes) as Marie Lindsey Gerard
Custer (1967, 1 episode) as Brigid O'Rourke
Batman (1968, 2 episodes) as Nora Clavicle
Peyton Place (1968-1969, 75 episodes) as Marsha Russell
Mannix (1968–1975, 2 episodes) as Rebekah Bigelow / Celia Bell
Marcus Welby, M.D. (1969-1972, 2 episodes) as Dorothy Carpenter / Nadine Cabot
Medical Center (1969-1974, 4 episodes) as Claire / Pauline / Judy / Nora Caldwell
Love, American Style (1970, 1 episode) as Carol (segment "Love and the Motel")
The Mod Squad (1971, 1 episode) as Mrs. Hamilton
Ironside (1971-1972, 2 episodes) as Lorraine Simms / Mme. Jabez
Night Gallery (1971, 1 episode) as Agatha Howard (segment "Cool Air")
Maude (1972, 1 episode) as Phyllis 'Bunny' Nash
The Streets of San Francisco (1973, 1 episode) as Anna Slovatzka Marshall
The New Dick Van Dyke Show (1973-1974, 3 episodes) as Margot Brighton
Cannon (1975, episode "Lady on the Run") as Linda Merrick 
The Bionic Woman (1976, 1 episode) as Ann Sommers / Chris Stuart
The Eddie Capra Mysteries (1978, 1 episode)
Fantasy Island (1978-1984, 3 episodes) as Mildred Koster / Kathy Moreau / Professor Smith-Myles
The Love Boat  (1979, 2 episodes) as Eleanor Gardner
The Seekers (1979 miniseries) as Peggy Kent
Flamingo Road (1980-1982, 38 episodes) as Eudora Weldon
Knight Rider (1983, 1 episode) as Elizabeth Knight
Magnum, P.I. (1984-1987, 2 episodes) as Phoebe Sullivan / Ann Carrington
Murder, She Wrote (1987, 1 episode) as Eva Taylor
Hearts Are Wild (1992, 1 episode) as Caroline Thorpe
All My Children (1992-1994, 35 episodes recurring) as Nola Orsini
Burke's Law (1995, 1 episode) as Judge Marian Darrow
The Outer Limits (1998, 1 episode) as Barbara Matheson
7th Heaven (1997-2007, 10 episodes) as Ruth Camden

References

External links

1927 births
Living people
20th-century American actresses
21st-century American actresses
American film actresses
American stage actresses
American radio actresses
Actresses from Denver
New Star of the Year (Actress) Golden Globe winners
University of California, Santa Barbara alumni
Actresses from California
Paramount Pictures contract players